Ian Gledhill (1958–2015) was a speedway rider from England.

Speedway career 
Gledhill rode in the top two tiers of British Speedway from 1976 to 1982, riding for various clubs. In 1979, he became the National League Riders' Champion.

References 

Living people
1958 births
2015 deaths
British speedway riders
Birmingham Brummies riders
Cradley Heathens riders
Eastbourne Eagles riders
Hackney Hawks riders
Mildenhall Fen Tigers riders
Oxford Cheetahs riders
Reading Racers riders
Stoke Potters riders
Wimbledon Dons riders
Wolverhampton Wolves riders